This is a list of women writers who were born in Kenya or whose writings are closely associated with that country.

A
Carolyne Adalla, novelist, author of Confessions of an AIDS victim (1993)

B
Karen Blixen (1885–1962), Danish novelist, short story writer, essayist, active in Kenya

G
Moraa Gitaa (active since 2008), novelist, short story writer
Wangui wa Goro (born 1961), poet, novelist, essayist, translator, non-fiction writer

H
Elspeth Huxley (1907–1997), non-fiction writer, poet, journalist, government adviser

L
Muthoni Likimani (born 1926), novelist, non-fiction writer

M
Olga Marlin (born 1934), American-born non-fiction writer
Micere Githae Mugo (born 1942), playwright, poet, non-fiction writer, educator, activist
Mwana Kupona (born c.1865), Swahili poet

N
Christine Nicholls (born 1943), biographer, non-fiction writer
Rebeka Njau (born 1932), novelist, playwright, educator

O
Asenath Bole Odaga (1937–2014), publisher and author
Cristina Odone (born 1960), journalist, newspaper editor, novelist
Margaret Ogola (1958–2011), novelist, biographer
Grace Ogot (1930–2015), short story writer, novelist
Marjorie Oludhe Macgoye (1928–2015), novelist, essayist, poet
Yvonne Adhiambo Owuor (born 1968), novelist

P
Shailja Patel (active since 2000), poet, playwright

R
Rebecca Nandwa (active since 1988), children's writer, writing in Swahili and English

S
Daphne Sheldrick (born 1934), wild life conservationist, writer
Hazel de Silva Mugot (born 1947), novelist

W
Charity Waciuma (born 1936), novelist
Miriam Were (born 1940), public health expert, educator, non-fiction writer
Carolinda Witt (born 1955), yoga specialist and writer

See also
 List of Kenyan men writers

-
Kenyan
Writers, women
Writers